European route E662 is a class B road, part of International E-road network in Serbia and Croatia. It connects E75 at Subotica, and E73 road at Osijek.

Itinerary

: Subotica south interchange (A1) – Subotica
: Subotica – Mala Bosna – Mišićevo – Bajmok – Aleksa Šantić – Svetozar Miletić – Sombor
: Sombor – Bezdan
: Bezdan – Bezdan border crossing – 51st division bridge over the river Danube

: Batina border crossing – Batina – Zmajevac – Kneževi Vinogradi – Karanac
: Kozarac – Švajcarnica – Bridge over the river Drava – Osijek (D2 at Frigis interchange)

See also
Roads in Croatia
Roads in Serbia

External links 
 UN Economic Commission for Europe: Overall Map of E-road Network (2007)
 International E-road network

699662
Roads in Croatia
Roads in Serbia